Joerie "The Shark" Mes (born March 16, 1979) is a Dutch former welterweight kickboxer, fighting out of Mike's Gym in Amsterdam. He is a former Dutch and European Muay Thai champion who later competed in K-1 MAX.  He is widely regarded as one of the greatest combination specialists in kickboxing history. After his kickboxing career he worked as a history teacher in Amsterdam for several years. He is now a fulltime kickboxing coach at Mike's Gym.

Biography and career
Joeri grew up in Amsterdam (Amsterdam Noord). As a kid, he excelled in field hockey, as a goalie. As he felt field hockey was not for him, he tried soccer for a short while, before he got involved in kick boxing.

Titles
 2005 It's Showtime 75MAX Trophy Tilburg Pool A winner
 WMTO European champion
 IPMTF Dutch (79 kg) champion
 2000 MTBN Dutch (76 kg) champion

Kickboxing record

|-  bgcolor="#FFBBBB"
| 2009-07-13 || Loss ||align=left| Yoshihiro Sato || K-1 World MAX 2009 Final 8, Reserve Fight || Tokyo, Japan || Ext R. Decision (Split)  || 4 || 3:00
|-  bgcolor="#CCFFCC"
| 2009-06-13 || Win ||align=left| Mohammed Medhar || Gentleman Promotions || Tilburg, Netherlands || Decision (Unanimous)|| 3 || 3:00
|-  bgcolor="#CCFFCC"
| 2009-05-16 || Win ||align=left| Shane Campbell || It's Showtime 2009 Amsterdam || Amsterdam, Netherlands || TKO (Referee stoppage) || 3 || 
|-  bgcolor="#CCFFCC"
| 2009-02-09 || Win ||align=left| Jan van Denderen || Fights at the Border presents: It's Showtime 2009 || Antwerp, Belgium || Decision (Unanimous) || 3 || 3:00
|-  bgcolor="#CCFFCC"
| 2008-11-29 || Win ||align=left| Chris Ngimbi || It's Showtime 2008 Eindhoven || Eindhoven, Netherlands || KO (Left hook) || 2 || 2:08
|-  bgcolor="#CCFFCC"
| 2008-10-01 || Win ||align=left| Takayuki Kohiruimaki || K-1 World MAX 2008 Final || Tokyo, Japan || KO (Left hook) || 3 || 2:59
|-  bgcolor="#FFBBBB"
| 2008-04-26 || Loss ||align=left| Nieky Holzken || K-1 World GP 2008 in Amsterdam || Amsterdam, Netherlands || KO (Spinning back kick) || 2 || 2:21
|-  bgcolor="#FFBBBB"
| 2008-03-08 || Loss ||align=left| Kenneth van Eesvelde || Fights at the Border 6 || Lommel, Belgium || TKO (Doctor stoppage) || 3 ||
|-  bgcolor="#FFBBBB"
| 2008-02-17 || Loss ||align=left| Marco Pique || K-1 MAX Netherlands 2008 || Utrecht, Netherlands || Decision (Ext. R) || 4 || 3:00
|-  bgcolor="#CCFFCC"
| 2007-09-23 || Win ||align=left| Imro Main || Rings "Risky Business" || Utrecht, Netherlands || Decision (Unanimous) || 5 || 3:00
|-  bgcolor="#FFBBBB"
| 2007-06-23 || Loss ||align=left| Murat Direkci || K-1 World Grand Prix 2007 in Amsterdam || Amsterdam, Netherlands || TKO (Doctor stoppage/cut) || 1 || 1:40
|-  bgcolor="#FFBBBB"
| 2007-05-06 || Loss ||align=left| Andy Souwer || SLAMM "Nederland vs Thailand III" || Haarlem, Netherlands || Decision (Unanimous) || 3 || 3:00
|-  bgcolor="#CCFFCC"
| 2007-03-24 || Win ||align=left| Jan de Keyzer || It's Showtime Trophy 2007 || Lommel, Belgium || KO (Left hook) || 1 || 1:03
|-
! style=background:white colspan=9 |
|-
|-  bgcolor="#FFBBBB"
| 2006-11-12 || Loss ||align=left| Tyrone Spong || Pride & Honor Ahoy 2006 || Rotterdam, Netherlands || TKO (Knee strike) || 5 || 1:12
|-  bgcolor="#FFBBBB"
| 2006-09-23 || Loss ||align=left| Ondrej Hutnik || It's Showtime 75MAX Trophy Final 2006, Semi Finals || Rotterdam, Netherlands || Decision || 3 || 3:00
|-
|-  bgcolor="#CCFFCC"
| 2006-09-23 || Win ||align=left| Emil Zoraj || It's Showtime 75MAX Trophy Final 2006, Quarter Finals || Rotterdam, Netherlands || Decision || 3 || 3:00
|-  bgcolor="#CCFFCC"
| 2006-05-13 || Win ||align=left| Ramon Dekkers || K-1 World Grand Prix 2006 in Amsterdam || Amsterdam, Netherlands || Decision (Unanimous) || 3 || 3:00
|-  bgcolor="#CCFFCC"
| 2006-02-12 || Win ||align=left| Ruben van den Giesen || Muay Thai Gala in Amsterdam|| Amsterdam, Netherlands || Decision (Unanimous) || 5 || 3:00
|-  bgcolor="#CCFFCC"
| 2005-10-02 || Win ||align=left| Yücel Fidan || It's Showtime 75MAX Trophy, 1st Round - Tilburg, Pool A Final || Tilburg, Netherlands || Decision (Unanimous) || 3 || 3:00
|-
! style=background:white colspan=9 |
|-
|-  bgcolor="#CCFFCC"
| 2005-10-02 || Win ||align=left| Cedric Copra || It's Showtime 75MAX Trophy, 1st Round - Tilburg, Pool A Semi Finals || Tilburg, Netherlands || TKO (Referee stoppage) || 1 || 0:40
|-  bgcolor="#CCFFCC"
| 2005-06-12 || Win ||align=left| Rayen Simson || It's Showtime 2005 Amsterdam || Amsterdam, Netherlands || Decision (Unanimous) || 5 || 3:00
|-  bgcolor="#CCFFCC"
| 2005-02-13 || Win ||align=left| Sem Braan || Muaythai in de Hoornse Vaart || Alkmaar, Netherlands || Decision (Unanimous) || 5 || 3:00
|-  bgcolor="#CCFFCC"
| 2004-12-18 || Win ||align=left| Moises Baptista De Sousa || SuperLeague Netherlands 2004 || Uden, Netherlands || KO (Left Hook) || 1 || 
|-  bgcolor="#CCFFCC"
| 2004-10-10 || Win ||align=left| Vincent Vielvoye || 2Hot2Handle 17 || Rotterdam, Netherlands || TKO || ||
|-  bgcolor="#FFBBBB"
| 2004-05-20 || Loss ||align=left| Pajonsuk || It's Showtime 2004 Amsterdam || Amsterdam, Netherlands || Decision || 5 || 3:00
|-  bgcolor="#CCFFCC"
| 2004-03-20 || Win ||align=left| Attila Nagy || SuperLeague Italy 2004 || Padova, Italy || Decision (Unanimous)|| 5 || 3:00
|-  bgcolor="#FFBBBB"
| 2003-12-06 || Loss ||align=left| Dmitry Shakuta || SuperLeague Netherlands 2003 || Rotterdam, Netherlands || KO (Right high kick) || 2 || 2:19
|-  bgcolor="#CCFFCC"
| 2003-09-27 || Win ||align=left| Roberto Cocco || SuperLeague Germany 2003 || Wuppertal, Germany || KO || 4 || 
|-  bgcolor="#CCFFCC"
| 2003-06-08 || Win ||align=left| Perry Ubeda || It's Showtime 2003 Amsterdam || Amsterdam, Netherlands || Decision (Unanimous) || 5 || 3:00
|-  bgcolor="#CCFFCC"
| 2003-04-28 || Win ||align=left| Jindrich Velecky || Tulp Muay Thai Gala|| Amsterdam, Netherlands || TKO || 4 || 
|-  bgcolor="#CCFFCC"
| 2003-03-16 || Win ||align=left| Rayen Simson || Victory or Hell || Amsterdam, Netherlands || Decision (Unanimous) || 5 || 3:00
|-  bgcolor="#CCFFCC"
| 2003-02-15 || Win ||align=left| Perry Ubeda || Xena Sports "Heaven or Hell 8" || Netherlands || Decision (Unanimous) || 5 || 3:00
|-  bgcolor="#CCFFCC"
| 2002-11-24 || Win ||align=left| Khalid Hanine || Xena Sports Victory Or Hell || Amsterdam, Netherlands || KO (High kick) || 1 ||
|-  bgcolor="#CCFFCC"
| 2002-09-29 || Win ||align=left| Rayen Simson || It's Showtime – As Usual / Battle Time || Haarlem, Netherlands || TKO (Corner stoppage) || 4 || 
|-  bgcolor="#FFBBBB"
| 2002-04-27 || Loss ||align=left| Şahin Yakut || Gala in Schremerhorn || Schermerhorn, Netherlands || Decision || 3 || 3:00
|-  bgcolor="#CCFFCC"
| 2002-02-12 || Win ||align=left| Donald Berner || WPKL Thaiboks Gala|| Amsterdam, Netherlands || Decision || 5 || 3:00
|-  bgcolor="#CCFFCC"
| 2001-10-21 || Win ||align=left| Habib Ben-Salah || It's Showtime - Original || Haarlem, Netherlands || TKO (Corner stoppage) || 4 || 3:00
|-  bgcolor="#CCFFCC"
| 2001-04-22 || Win ||align=left| Fouad Tijarti || Veni, Vidi, Vici || Veenendaal, Netherlands || Decision || 5 || 3:00
|-  bgcolor="#CCFFCC"
| 2000-12-12 || Win ||align=left| Gerbrand Takens || It's Showtime - Christmas Edition || Haarlem, Netherlands || KO (Left body shot) || 3 || 1:30
|-  bgcolor="#CCFFCC"
| 2000-10-22 || Win ||align=left| Şahin Yakut || It's Showtime - Exclusive || Haarlem, Netherlands || Decision (Unanimous) || 5 || 3:00
|-  bgcolor="#CCFFCC"
| 2000-05-20 || Win ||align=left| Tommy Walraven || Thaiboxing -Thrill of the Year || Amsterdam, Netherlands || Decision (Unanimous) || 5 || 3:00
|-
! style=background:white colspan=9 |
|-
|-
| colspan=9 | Legend:

See also 
List of K-1 events
List of It's Showtime events
List of It's Showtime champions
List of male kickboxers

External links
Joerie Mes K-1 profile
Mike's Gym Official site

References

Dutch male kickboxers
Welterweight kickboxers
Dutch Muay Thai practitioners
Living people
1979 births
Sportspeople from Amsterdam